The 1966 New York Mets season was the fifth regular season for the Mets. They went 66–95 and finished 9th in the NL. They were managed by Wes Westrum. They played home games at Shea Stadium.

1966 marked the first season in which the Mets avoided a last place finish, as well as the first time they did not lose at least 100 games.

Offseason
 October 20, 1965: Charley Smith and Al Jackson were traded by the Mets to the St. Louis Cardinals for Ken Boyer.
 November 29, 1965: Al Luplow was purchased by the Mets from the Cleveland Indians.
 November 30, 1965: Joe Christopher was traded by the Mets to the Boston Red Sox for Ed Bressoud.
 January 6, 1966: Gary Kroll was traded by the Mets to the Houston Astros for Johnny Weekly and cash.

Regular season
 September 11, 1966: Pitcher Pat Jarvis of the Atlanta Braves becomes the first of 5,714 strikeout victims of Nolan Ryan's career.

Season standings

Record vs. opponents

Notable transactions
 April 3, 1966: Tom Seaver was signed as an amateur free agent by the Mets.
 June 4, 1966: Galen Cisco was released by the Mets.
 June 7, 1966: Duffy Dyer was drafted by the Mets in the 1st round (9th pick) of the 1966 Major League Baseball Draft (Secondary Phase).
 June 10, 1966: Bob Shaw was purchased by the Mets from the San Francisco Giants.
 August 6, 1966: Ralph Terry was purchased by the Mets from the Kansas City Athletics.

Roster

Player stats

Batting

Starters by position 
Note: Pos = Position; G = Games played; AB = At bats; H = Hits; Avg. = Batting average; HR = Home runs; RBI = Runs batted in

Other batters 
Note: G = Games played; AB = At bats; H = Hits; Avg. = Batting average; HR = Home runs; RBI = Runs batted in

Pitching

Starting pitchers 
Note: G = Games pitched; IP = Innings pitched; W = Wins; L = Losses; ERA = Earned run average; SO = Strikeouts

Other pitchers 
Note: G = Games pitched; IP = Innings pitched; W = Wins; L = Losses; ERA = Earned run average; SO = Strikeouts

Relief pitchers 
Note: G = Games pitched; W = Wins; L = Losses; SV = Saves; ERA = Earned run average; SO = Strikeouts

Farm system

LEAGUE CHAMPIONS: Auburn, Marion

Notes

References
1966 New York Mets at Baseball Reference
1966 New York Mets team page at www.baseball-almanac.com

New York Mets seasons
New York Mets season
New York Mets
1960s in Queens